Joel Stein (born July 23, 1971) is an American journalist who wrote for the Los Angeles Times. He wrote a column and occasional articles for Time for 19 years until 2017.

Early life
Stein grew up in Edison, New Jersey, the son of a salesman. He is Jewish. Stein attended J.P. Stevens High School, where he was a writer and entertainment editor for Hawkeye, the student newspaper. He majored in English at Stanford University and wrote a weekly column for the school's student newspaper, The Stanford Daily.  He graduated in 1993 with a BA and an MA and moved to New York City, and then to Los Angeles in 2005.

Career
Stein's career began as a writer and researcher for Martha Stewart Living. He worked a year for Stewart and later quipped that she had fired him twice in the same day.  Stein did fact-checking at various publications before becoming a sports editor and columnist for Time Out New York, where he stayed for two years.  While working at Time Out New York, he was a contestant on MTV's short-lived game show Idiot Savants. Stein joined Time in August 1997 and his last column for the magazine appeared on November 16, 2017. In signing off, he began, "Since my first column, 19 years ago, readers and co-workers have clamored to have me fired." He concluded, "There are times when society needs a punk who doesn’t care. There are far fewer times when society needs a 46-year-old punk who doesn’t care. I’ve always been guilty of hanging on too long out of fear of graduating college, ending relationships and transitioning from democracy to authoritarianism. I look forward to a future columnist who makes me laugh about that."

Stein sometimes appears as a commentator on television programs such as I Love the '80s. He also co-produced three TV pilots: an animated series for VH1 and two for ABC. The animated show, titled Hey Joel, aired in Canada and later in South Africa, while the other two were never picked up.  He was a writer and producer for the sitcom Crumbs.

Stein taught a class on humor writing at Princeton University before moving to Los Angeles in early 2005 to write for the Los Angeles Times. In 2012, he published a book, Man Made: A Stupid Quest for Masculinity.

Notable columns
On January 24, 2006, the Los Angeles Times published an anti-war and anti-military column by Stein under the headline "Warriors and Wusses" in which he wrote that it is a cop-out to oppose a war and yet claim to support the soldiers fighting it. "I don't support our troops. ... When you volunteer for the U.S. military, you pretty much know you're not going to be fending off invasions from Mexico and Canada. So you're willingly signing up to be a fighting tool of American imperialism ...". He prefaced his argument by stating that he does not support the troops in Iraq despite supporting the troops being "a position that even Calvin is unwilling to urinate on." Stein states he did three interviews about the column on the Hugh Hewitt radio show, with Tony Snow, and with a "liberal" in Oregon. Mark Steyn wrote in a New York Sun opinion piece that Stein was to be congratulated for the consistency of his position: "Stein is a hawkish chicken, disdaining the weasel formulation too many anti-war folks take refuge in." Warrant Officer Michael D. Fay wrote in The New York Times that Stein's comments made him feel "sad because they're so mistaken, sad because their voices are granted a modicum of credence in the public forum, and sad because they leave me feeling a little less at home."

In 2008, Stein wrote an article for the Los Angeles Times titled "Who runs Hollywood? C'mon", which mocked the canard of Jews controlling Hollywood by feigning outrage over declining acceptance of the stereotype.

In July 2010, Stein wrote a humor column for Time in which he expressed his discomfort at the impact immigration of Indians has had on his hometown of Edison, New Jersey. Stein initially took to Twitter to defend himself with a tweet saying "Didn't meant to insult Indians with my column this week. Also stupidly assumed their emails would follow that Gandhi non-violence thing." Time and Stein subsequently publicly apologized for the article. Stein's apology read: "I truly feel stomach-sick that I hurt so many people. I was trying to explain how, as someone who believes that immigration has enriched American life and my hometown in particular, I was shocked that I could feel a tiny bit uncomfortable with my changing town when I went to visit it. If we could understand that reaction, we'd be better equipped to debate people on the other side of the immigration issue." United States Senator from New Jersey Bob Menendez submitted a letter to Time stating that the column "not only fell terribly flat but crossed the lines of offensiveness toward a particular community that has dealt with violent hate crimes in the past. Mr. Stein's mocking allusions to revered deities in the Hindu religion are particularly reprehensible." Kal Penn, actor and former associate director in the White House Office of Public Engagement, also criticized the column for its portrayal of Indian Americans.

Slate magazine writer Tom Scocca wrote of the column, "To a charitable reader, it's clear that the piece was trying not to be offensive. Stein's description of his childhood small-town idyll before the mass immigration is deliberately fake-sentimental, describing lowlife white kids stealing things and getting drunk. He was trying to make more fun of white people than he made of Indian people." Nonetheless, Scocca wrote, many Indian-Americans received the column "as an unironic anti-immigrant rant."

In May 2013, Stein penned a Time cover story titled "The Me Me Me Generation" about the narcissistic and immature tendencies of millennials, but how they will also "save us all." The New Republic, The Atlantic, New York, and The Nation, criticized Stein for selective use of evidence, for making sweeping generalizations about the behavior of millennials, and for repeating claims that prior generations had made about the young people in their times.

Assessments
"I think he’s got the quirkiest sense of humor I see today,"  Walter Isaacson, the chairman and CEO of CNN News Group told  Stanford Magazine. "Joel's honed that self-effacing self-indulgence to a great art form."

"Stein can occasionally be funny," wrote Variety TV columnist Brian Lowry when Stein was writing his column for the Los Angeles Times. "But what really bothers me about his work is that none of the ideas seem to have the weight to sustain a column. They're more like random musings str-et-ch-ed to column length ... Somehow, every column keeps cycling back to Stein's favorite subject—Joel Stein, and finding employment opportunities for Joel Stein."

Stein "is not funny," wrote Tom Scocca in Slate, arguing that his "lack of funniness is the key to understanding any phenomenon involving Joel Stein. He is a bad and incompetent humor writer, a writer who lacks the basic ability to control his tone and persona. I know no one under 50 who does not hate him because of this." Scocca concluded, "Joel Stein is a soft writer in a soft gig, dressed up in an older generation's clothing, with an expired comic license in his pocket."

"In a magazine whose regular essayists include such deep thinkers as Charles Krauthammer, Margaret Carlson and Roger Rosenblatt, Stein's column is decidedly lightweight," wrote the Stanford alumni magazine in fall 2001. "No one would call Stein's commentary sophisticated." Stein acknowledged, "My whole goal is to use Time magazine to make important people do stupid things."

In an online column for Vanity Fair, Juli Weiner characterized Stein as a "forgettable I Love the '80s participant and Time magazine humor (?) columnist."

"I don't think I am a real journalist," Stein told Alex Kuczynski for The New York Times in 2000. "I feel like I am, well, whatever we all are now: I am a celebrity journalist."  Kuczynski wrote that Stein's columns were marked by "bawdy humor, tasteless one-liners and something that can best be described as a sort of polished vulgarity."

Depictions in popular culture
In 2000, The Onion spoofed Stein's persona in a satire whose headline was "Cocktail-Party Guest Cornered by Joel Stein."

In 2014, Stein played himself on an episode of The Neighbors along with Lawrence O'Donnell and Bill Nye.

References

External links
 Joel Stein's official site
 Biography at the Los Angeles Times
 Biography at Time
 
 Rumpus interview with Joel Stein

1971 births
American male journalists
American television writers
J. P. Stevens High School alumni
American male television writers
Living people
People from Edison, New Jersey
Stanford University alumni
Jewish American writers
Jewish American journalists
Screenwriters from New Jersey
21st-century American Jews